The 2012–13 Druga HNL (also known as 2. HNL) is the 22nd season of Croatia's second level football competition since its establishment in 1992. The season started on 18 August 2012 and is expected to end on 1 June 2013.

NK Dugopolje were league champions and earned a place in Croatia's first division, but were unable to complete all the requirement necessary for top league license. None of the teams from 2011–12 season were promoted to 1. HNL.

Format
The league is contested by 16 teams (one more than in the previous season). Only three teams from Treća HNL were granted license for competing in the Druga HNL, but only Primorac 1929 and Zelina were promoted.

Lučko, Šibenik and Karlovac were relegated from 2011–12 Prva HNL and were supposed to participate in the 2012–13 Druga HNL season. But only Lučko and Šibenik fulfilled all the requirements necessary for the second level license, while Karlovac was relegated to Treća HNL. A fourth team, the financially troubled Varaždin, was suspended from the 2011–12 Prva HNL mid-season for not paying its players, and was immediately relegated to the lowest football level possible of the Croatian football league system, being the seventh-tier Third County League.

Changes from last season
The following clubs have been promoted or relegated at the end of the 2011–12 season:

From 2. HNL
Promoted to 1. HNL
 none

Relegated to 3. HNL
 Marsonia 1909 (12th place)
 Međimurje (13th place)
 Croatia Sesvete (15th place)

To 2. HNL
Relegated from 1. HNL
 Lučko (13th place)
 Šibenik (14th place)

Promoted from 3. HNL
 Primorac 1929 (3. HNL South runners-up)
 Zelina (3. HNL West winners)

Clubs

League table

Results

Top goalscorers
The top scorers in the 2012–13 Druga HNL season were:

See also
2012–13 Prva HNL
2012–13 Croatian Cup

References

External links
Official website  

First Football League (Croatia) seasons
Drug
Cro